Kaľava (until 1899 ) is a village and municipality in the Spišská Nová Ves District in the Košice Region of central-eastern Slovakia. The village is situated on the southern side of the mountains Branisko.

History
In historical records the village was first mentioned in 1300.

Geography
The village lies at an altitude of 560 metres and covers an area of 4.45 km².
It has a population of about 427 inhabitants.

Genealogical resources

The records for genealogical research are available at the state archive "Statny Archiv in Levoca, Slovakia"

 Roman Catholic church records (births/marriages/deaths): 1722-1918 (parish B)

See also
 List of municipalities and towns in Slovakia

External links
http://www.kalava.sk
Surnames of living people in Kalava

Villages and municipalities in Spišská Nová Ves District